Nauruan Pidgin English is an English-based pidgin spoken in Nauru. It appears to be the result of a merger of Chinese-type and Melanesian-type pidgins (see Micronesian Pidgin English).

References

Sources

English-based pidgins and creoles
Languages of Nauru